Hassanabad is one of the villages of the Hunza Valley. The Karakoram Highway (KKH) crawls through Hassanabad, with total length of 5 kilometers. Hassanabad is known for power generation, with almost all of the hydro-power projects of Hunza located here, except for Ahmedabad Hydel Power Plant.

Location 
Hassanabad is located in between Aliabad and Murtazaabad villages. Hassanabad is located at an average height of 2100 meters.

Hassanabad is located on the Karakoram Highway (N-35).  In 2022, the bridge across a tributary of the Hunza was destroyed by floodwaters.

Constituency 
Hassanabad is in constituency of GBLA-6. Hassanabad comes in district Hunza and tehsil Aliabad.

Mountains 
Hassanabad is also gateway to Hachinder Chish (7162.4 meters).

People 
The population is of the town is around 1500 people. All of the residents are Muslims.

Tribes 
Two of the old Hunza tribes are present in Hassanabad, Ganishkutz and Xhill Ganishkutz.

Notable People 
 Amir Mehdi

Gems 
Hassnabad nala is famous for different precious and semi-precious stones. Most common gems are Corundum, Diamond and Sapphire.

Hassanabad Power Complex 
Gilgit-Baltistan Public works Department (GBPWD) manages Hassanabad Power Complex. Complex is a combination of Hydel and Thermal, Power generation plants.
 1200KW Norwegian Unit (1994)
 500KW Chinese Unit (2003)
 200KW Chinese Unit (1991)
 2X1000KW Diesel Generators (2007/2015)

See also 
Aliabad

Murtaazabad

Karimabad

References 

Hunza
Populated places in Hunza District